The 1921 International cricket season was from April 1921 to August 1921.

Season overview

May

Australia in England

August

Scotland in Ireland

Foresters in Netherlands

References

1921 in cricket